The Adventurer of Tunis is a 1931 German adventure film directed by Willi Wolff and starring Philipp Manning, Theo Shall, and Ellen Richter. It was made at the Staaken Studios in Berlin. Location shooting took place in Marseille and Nice in France, Genoa and the Italian Riviera and in Tunis and the Sahara Desert. The film's art direction was by Robert Neppach and Willy Schiller.

Synopsis
During an Arab uprising in North Africa, the European employees of a copper mine are besieged and need urgent help. When his government refuses to provide military assistance, the firm's Parisian owner sends his nephew Henry Bertell with weapons and ammunition. A rival company is behind the uprising, and sends one of its agents a dancer named Collette to seduce Henry and foil his mission. However, as they travel through Southern France together she falls in love with him and changes sides.

Cast
 Philipp Manning as Henry Bertell
 Theo Shall as René
 Ellen Richter as Colette, a dancer
 Charles Puffy as Emil Dupont
 Senta Söneland as Agathe - Bertell's wife
 Ferdinand Hart as Valera
 Leonard Steckel as Ferrero
 Rosa Valetti as Madame Rosa
 Heinrich Marlow as Martini
 Hans Hermann Schaufuß as First Police Commissioner
 Julius Falkenstein as Second Police Commissioner
 Aruth Wartan as Man from the Levante
 Henry Bender as Portier bei Bertell
 Emil Rameau as Prokurist bei Bertell

References

Bibliography 
 Klaus, Ulrich J. Deutsche Tonfilme: Jahrgang 1931. Klaus-Archiv, 2006.

External links 
 

1931 films
1931 adventure films
Films of the Weimar Republic
German adventure films
1930s German-language films
Films directed by Willi Wolff
German black-and-white films
1930s German films
Films shot at Staaken Studios